was a Japanese actor and voice actor. He graduated from the Chiba Prefectural Kōnodai High School and enrolled in the Career Design course of Hosei University. He was attached to Quarter Tone. He was the younger brother of actor Atsushi Itō.

On March 8, 2009, Itō's body was discovered inside an automobile in a parking lot near Lake Sagami in Sagamihara, Kanagawa Prefecture, along with some yeontan (apparently used to commit suicide) and a note addressed to his family. The cause of death was determined to be acute carbon monoxide poisoning.

Roles

Films 
 Andromedia (Boy on the bus)

Television drama 
 Train Man (Chūbō)
 Nodame Cantabile (Haruto Segawa)

Voice acting roles

Dubbing 
 Jack the Bear (Dylan Leary (Miko Hughes))
 Lost in Space (Will Robinson (Jack Johnson))
 Mentors (Oliver Cates (Chad Krowchuk)
 The Shining (Danny Torrance (Danny Lloyd))
 Teenage Mutant Ninja Turtles III (Yoshi (Travis A. Moon))

Television animation 
 Boogiepop Haharawanai

References 

1987 births
2009 deaths
Japanese male child actors
Japanese male television actors
Japanese male voice actors
Male voice actors from Chiba Prefecture
Suicides by carbon monoxide poisoning in Japan
Voice actors from Funabashi
2009 suicides